Alastair Crawford is CEO and founder of i-CD Publishing, the precursor to 192.com.

An internet entrepreneur,  he founded i-CD Publishing (UK) Ltd in 1997, which published the UK-info Disk range.  He was the first person to publish the electoral roll on CD ROM, which led to a legal dispute with Royal Mail, settled in 2004. The case was mentioned in the book Silent State, by Heather Brooke. 
 
Crawford was also the first to publish a UK directory enquiry site (192.com), and the first to challenge BT's monopoly of directory enquiries.

Alastair lives in London and is an ex-Harrow School student.

References

Year of birth missing (living people)
Living people
Businesspeople from London